Robert Milton "Bob" Hartsfield (December 15, 1931 in Atlanta – January 25, 1999 in Roswell, Georgia), nicknamed Poochie, was a minor league baseball player, manager and scout. He was the brother of Roy Hartsfield.

Playing career
Hartsfield played 11 seasons in the minors, from 1950 to 1961. In 1,086 games, he hit .273 with 32 home runs. Perhaps his best season was 1955, with the Greenville Spinners and Atlanta Crackers. That year, he hit .307 in 113 games.

Scouting career
Hartsfield scouted for the Chicago Cubs in 1965 and from 1977 to 1981. From 1966 to 1970, he served as an Atlanta Braves scout, from 1971 to 1973, he served as a San Francisco Giants scout, and he served as a scout for the Houston Astros as well. From 1991 to 1992, he was the Seattle Mariners Major League advance scout. He was the scouting director for the Giants from 1994 to 1997.

Managerial career
Hartsfield managed in the minors from 1974 to 1985, and again in 1992.

Year-by-year managerial record

References

1931 births
1999 deaths
Atlanta Crackers players
Atlanta Braves scouts
Austin Senators players
Baseball players from Atlanta
Charlotte Hornets (baseball) players
Chicago Cubs scouts
Houston Astros scouts
Houston Buffs players
Greenville Spinners players
Jacksonville Braves players
Landis Spinners players
Major League Baseball scouting directors
Minor league baseball managers
New York Yankees scouts
San Francisco Giants executives
San Francisco Giants scouts
Seattle Mariners scouts
Statesville Owls players
Thibodaux Giants players
Wichita Braves players